Boomf is a UK company which delivers personalised gifts through the letterbox. The company launched in 2013 selling personalised marshmallows with photos printed on top. Boomf now offer a range of gifts, the Boomf 'bomb' (a personalised greeting card that pops out of the envelope) and the Boomf 'Flutter' (a personalised greeting card with a butterfly flying out).

Background
Boomf was founded in November 2013 by James Middleton and Andy Bell. Middleton had previously founded Nice Cakes, which specialised in personalised cakes. Bell had previously founded Mint Digital, which created StickyGram (now Sticky9), an Instagram magnet company which sold to PhotoBox. Boomf combines elements from both businesses.

History
In 2014, Boomf raised over $1m and is backed by a number of angel investors, including Nick Jenkins, founder of Moonpig, Duncan Jennings and Matt Wheeler.

Boomf launched in November 2013 without mentioning Middleton's involvement, to allow for a low profile launch. In January 2014, Boomf announced Middleton's involvement, believing that it would be impossible to keep it secret long-term.

The initial reaction to Boomf was incredulity; in the Bluff the Listener section of NPR's Wait, Wait... Don't Tell Me, one listener believed it was more plausible that Vladimir Putin had a brother Igor who had invented a pill to stop old people smelling, than that the Duchess of Cambridge's brother has launched a personalised marshmallow company.

Nevertheless, Boomf shipped 2 tons of marshmallows in its first year and made £100,000 ($168,000) in sales in its first three months.

Boomf launched a real-time personalised marshmallow service on a reconditioned Pashley's tricycle in the department store Selfridges, as part of Selfridge's Meet the Makers pop-up season. For Valentines, Boomf created a S'mores pop-up, allowing customers to roast their ex.

In July 2015, Boomf launched a nationwide search for a new marshmallow designer. The winner was Bournemouth University student Izzy Burton.

After initially specialising in creating personalised marshmallows, the company then diversified into other novelties, such as the Boomf Bomb, the Boomf Cannon, the Boomf Flutter Card, the Boomf Wild Card and the Ta-Dah Card - all different types of photo cards which explode in a shower of confetti. 

These exploding cards have become  popular on social media, increasing not only Boomf’s Instagram  and Facebook  following (which stand at an industry record-breaking circa 500k followers per account), but also allowed Boomf to report its first profit in 2019 - of £175,000 - and an increase in sales of up to £4.4 million from £2.8 million in the previous year. The company moved into new offices in Reading with circa 20,000 square feet to warehouse space. 

Following a strong 2019, Boomf posted in excess of one million pounds in profit in 2020.

However, according to Boomf’s former CEO, Sophie Dummer, in 2021 the company’s “...cost to market on social media channels has risen beyond all expectations and as a niche personalised brand, it has become difficult for Boomf to survive as a standalone business in this increasingly competitive environment”.

As a result, in January 2022 it was revealed that Boomf has been acquired by a consortium of investors, led by an Estonian businessman and founder of Galaev & Grierson venture capital firm, Stepan Galaev, working with Roman Grigoriev, the founder of the global photography company Splento, who has become Boomf’s new CEO.

References

Further reading

External links
 

Marshmallows
British companies established in 2013
Companies based in Berkshire